Bontoni is a third-generation luxury Italian shoemaker that crafts handmade men's dress shoes. The brand produces a very exclusive line of ready-made men's dress shoes that range from dressy to casual. Bontoni's nine-person workshop is located on the outskirts of Montegranaro in the Marche Region of Italy.

Background

Bontoni is a third-generation luxury Italian shoemaker that manufactures handmade men's shoes. Bontoni was founded in 2004 by Franco Gazzani (third-generation family shoemaker) and his distant cousin Lewis Cutillo. Prior to 2004, Gazzani's grandfather, uncle, and father made custom shoes for a limited number of clients under no label.  Many of the models carried by the brand were originally created by Gazzani's father and grandfather. The name Bontoni originated from the French bon ton, which means sophisticated manner.

Bontoni's nine artisans produce just, 2600 pairs a year. From start to finish, each pair of Bontoni shoes takes about 14 weeks to complete and nearly 26 working hours. Bontoni's Casa e Bottega, or home-based workshop, is located in Gazzani's basement in The Marches Region of Italy. It represents Bontoni one of the last remaining established, in-home family-owned artisanal workshops in all of Italy.

Overview 

Bontoni is renowned for its palette of richly hand-colored leathers, original designs, and high level of hand workmanship.  Bontoni's bespoke, or su misura offering requires 2-3 separate fittings and can take 7–10 months to complete.  Bontoni's ready-made collection is available at a select number of retailers throughout the world that include Bergdorf Goodman, Harrods, Wilkes Bashford, Beymen, Richard's, Mario's, Boyds, Stanley Korshak, Harry Rosen, as well as several others.

See also

List of Italian companies

References

External links
Official Website

Shoe companies of Italy
Shoe brands
Italian brands
High fashion brands
Shoemakers
Luxury brands
Companies based in le Marche
Fashion accessory brands